Lilia Bolocan (born November 13, 1972,  Tîrşiţei, Teleneşti) is a historian, politician and doctor of psychology from the Republic of Moldova, who since December 24, 2009 has been the General Manager of the State Agency for Intellectual Property of the Republic of Moldova. He has served as Director General of State Agency for Intellectual Property since 2009. In 2010-2011 she was deputy in the Parliament of the Republic of Moldova. Lilia Bolocan is part of the Liberal Democratic Party of Moldova (LDPM) since 2007. He is a member of the LDPM National Political Council.

References

1972 births
Living people
Liberal Democratic Party of Moldova MPs
Moldovan MPs 2010–2014